Shadow Builder is a 1998 horror film directed by Jamie Dixon. It is based on the story "The Shadow Builder" by Bram Stoker.

Plot
An evil Archbishop and his followers summon a demon to destroy the world, but the demon's first act is to kill its summoners. It does so in an appropriately unique manner, by turning the bodies of its victims into what appears to be solid shadow, which disintegrates at the first touch of light, any light. Light is in fact the demon's anathema. Unable to stand the slightest glimmer at its creation, the creature gains strength and solidity with each kill, allowing it a greater resistance to the light; and with it the ability to affect and control those around it, including a pack of vicious dogs. As the town is orchestrated towards its own destruction, it proceeds to hunt down a particular child. A pivotal sacrifice, necessary to complete its transition into the light, and unleash its Evil.

Cast
Michael Rooker as Jacob Vassey
Leslie Hope as Jennifer Hatcher
Shawn Thompson as Sheriff Sam Logan
Andrew Jackson as Shadowbuilder
Kevin Zegers as Chris Hatcher
Tony Todd as Evert Covey
Catherine Bruhier as Maggie MacKinnon
Charlotte Sullivan as Jazz
David Calderisi as Bishop Gallo
Paul Soles as Mr. Butterman
Billie Mae Richards as Mrs. Butterman
Nicole Stoffman as Kelly
Steve Blum as Shadowbuilder (voice)

Reception
TV Guide noted in its positive review that "While the basic premise and a few details of Shadow Builder are familiar, the movie has been put together with commendable skill."

References

External links

1998 films
American supernatural horror films
Canadian supernatural horror films
English-language Canadian films
Films based on short fiction
1998 horror films
Films based on works by Bram Stoker
1990s English-language films
1990s American films
1990s Canadian films